The manga of Blood Blockade Battlefront originally released in 2008 as a one-shot chapter called Kekkai Sensō by Yasuhiro Nightow, which only featured very few members of the final cast and had a much different tone, with more emphasis on it being a vampire hunting story in a contemporary city. The publication originally began on January 5, 2009 in the Jump Square magazine with the title  where it ran until March 4, 2009, followed by another one-shot in October 2009 in Jump SQ-M magazine. The plot revolves around a young photographer named Leonardo Watch, who obtains 'the All Seeing Eyes of the Gods' at the cost of his sister's eyesight. After the incident, Leonardo moves to the city of Hellsalem's Lot to join an organization known as Libra to fight several monsters as well as terrorists.

In May 2010 the manga switched to Jump SQ19 magazine for serial publication. Jump SQ19 magazine ceased publication on February 19, 2015. The first tankōbon volume was released on January 4, 2010; ten volumes have been released as of April 3, 2015. In 2010, the series was licensed for an English release by Dark Horse Comics.

A direct sequel entitled Blood Blockade Battlefront: Back 2 Back started in Jump SQ Crown magazine on July 17, 2015. In 2018, the series was transferred to Jump SQ Rise. The series finished on April 28, 2022. The final volume number 10 was released on 4 August 2022.

A third series Blood Blockade Battlefront: Beat 3 Peat brgan publishing on October 26, 2022 and is currently ongoing.

Volumes

Blood Blockade Battlefront

Blood Blockade Battlefront: Back 2 Back

References

Blood Blockade Battlefront